The year 1897 in art involved some significant events.

Events
 February 18 – Conclusion of the Benin Expedition of 1897, leading to the Benin Bronzes being carried off to London.
 April 3 – Vienna Secession founded by artists including Gustav Klimt, Koloman Moser, Josef Hoffmann, Joseph Maria Olbrich, Max Kurzweil. Secession hall designed by Olbrich.
 May 1 – Ny Carlsberg Glyptotek art museum opened in Copenhagen.
 May 27 – A Separate Exhibition of Painting and Sculpture (Wystawa osobna obrazów i rzeźb) is staged at Sukiennice Museum in Main Square, Kraków.
 August 4 – The "Lady of Elche" Iberian sculpture (4th century BCE) is found at L'Alcúdia near Elche in Spain.
 September – Edvard Munch stages a major retrospective in Christiania.
 October 27 – First meeting of the Society of Polish Artists "Sztuka" in Kraków.
 At Giverny, Claude Monet begins painting his Water Lilies series, which will continue until the end of his life.
 Elbridge Ayer Burbank begins painting portraits of Native Americans in the United States from life.
 Women photographers Zaida Ben-Yusuf and Gertrude Käsebier open portrait studios in New York City.
 A Book of Fifty Drawings by Aubrey Beardsley is published.
 Bernard Berenson publishes Central Italian Painters of the Renaissance.

Works

 Edwin Austin Abbey – The Play Scene in Hamlet
 Philip Burne-Jones – The Vampire
 Georges Clairin – Sarah Bernhardt as the Queen in 'Ruy Blas'
 Herbert James Draper – Pot Pourri
 Roberto Ferruzzi – Madonnina
 Akseli Gallen-Kallela – Lemminkäinen's Mother
 Paul Gauguin – Where Do We Come From? What Are We? Where Are We Going?
 Ogata Gekkō – Ryu sho ten (published 1898)
 J. W. Godward – Dolce far Niente (first version)
 Jean-Jacques Henner – Portrait of Mlle Fouquier
 Jacek Malczewski – Vicious Circle
 Claude Monet
 Branch of the Seine near Giverny (Mist)
 Morning on the Seine near Giverny
 The Seine at Giverny
 Edvard Munch – The Kiss
 Camille Pissarro
 Boulevard Montmartre
 Boulevard Montmartre in Spring
 Boulevard Montmartre on a Winter Morning
 Maurice Prendergast – Summer Visitors
 Henri Rousseau – The Sleeping Gypsy
 John Singer Sargent – Mr. and Mrs. I. N. Phelps Stokes
 Henryk Siemiradzki – A Christian Dirce
 Douglas Tilden – Admission Day Monument, San Francisco
 Vasily Vereshchagin – Napoleon near Borodino
 Arthur Wardle – The Totteridge XI
 Painters under the direction of Jan Styka – Transylvania Panorama (Lwów)

Births
 January 9 – Tyra Lundgren, Swedish painter, ceramist, glass and textile designer and writer on art (died 1979)
 January 17 – Charles Ragland Bunnell, American painter (died 1968)
 January 21 – René Iché, French sculptor (died 1954)
 March 16 – Antonio Donghi, Italian painter (died 1963)
 June 3 – Georg Mayer-Marton, Hungarian-born graphic artist (died 1960)
 June 22 – Albert Renger-Patzsch, German photographer (died 1966)
 June 26 – Victor Servranckx, Belgian painter (died 1965)
 August 19 – Roman Vishniac, Russian American photographer (died 1990)
 September 23 – Paul Delvaux, Belgian painter (died 1994)
 October 27 – Lena Gurr, American painter and lithographer (died 1992)
 November 5 – Hilda Vīka, Latvian painter (died 1963)

Deaths
 February 7 – Charles Edward Boutibonne, French Classicist painter (born 1816)
 February 9 – George Price Boyce, English Pre-Raphaelite watercolour landscape painter (born 1826)
 March 21 – Ādams Alksnis, Latvian painter (born 1864)
 May 20 – Jacques Émile Édouard Brandon, French artist (born 1831)
 June 7 – Victor Mottez, French fresco and portrait painter (born 1809)
 September 8 – James Milo Griffith, Welsh sculptor (born 1843)
 September 20 – Louis Pierre Mouillard, French artist and aviation pioneer (born 1834)
 October 5 – Sir John Gilbert, English painter (born 1817)
 October 8 – Alexei Savrasov, Russian landscape painter (born 1830)
 November 18 – Henry Doulton, English potter (born 1820)
 November 29 – Félix Pissarro, French-born painter, TB (born 1874)
 December 30 – Edward La Trobe Bateman, English-born Pre-Raphaelite watercolour painter, book illuminator, draughtsman and garden designer (born 1816)
 date unknown – Jang Seung-eop ('Owon'), Korean painter (born 1843)

References

 
Years of the 19th century in art
1890s in art